Dreamcatcher is a greatest hits package released  in the United Kingdom in 2000 by Secret Garden, an Irish-Norwegian duo consisting of Irish violinist Fionnuala Sherry and Norwegian composer/pianist Rolf Løvland. A version with an alternative track listing was released on 22 May 2001 in the United States, and a special Australian tour edition in 2004.

The opening track Nocturne is a mostly instrumental song that  won the Eurovision Song Contest in 1995.  The album cover features a recoloured photograph of the Eilean Donan castle.

Reception 
In 2001, the album reached number 4 on the Billboard New Age chart. The Australian tour edition released in 2004 topped the classical music chart in that country and made the top 50 of the album charts in March 2004.

Track listing
Releases in different countries differed slightly in the included tracks.

UK version (2000)
The 2000 United Kingdom version included:
"Nocturne" (3:11)
"Prayer" (4:30)
"Moving" (3:22)
"Dreamcatcher" (4:35)
"Sigma" (3:05)
"Song from a Secret Garden" (3:32)
"Sona" (4:16)
"Passacaglia" (3:47)
"Elan" (3:08)
"In Our Tears" (4:36)
"Celebration" (3:57)
"Heartstrings" (3:22)
"Steps" (4:01)
"Adagio" (2:51)
"The Rap" (2:31)
"Hymn to Hope" (4:18)
"Lore of the Loom" (3:17)
"Dawn of a New Century" (6:08)

US version (2001)
The track listing on the version released in the US 2001 is:
"Nocturne" (3:14)
"Prayer" (4:36)
"Moving" (3:22)
"Dreamcatcher" (4:41)
"Sigma" (3:07)
"Song from a Secret Garden" (3:33)
"Sona" (4:21)
"Passacaglia" (3:46)
"Elan" (3:12)
"In Our Tears" (4:39)
"Celebration" (3:56))
"Heartstrings" (3:23)
"Steps" (4:02)
"Adagio" (2:53)
"The Rap" (2:34)
"Hymn to Hope" (4:20)
"Lore of the Loom" (3:21)
"Dawn of a New Century" (6:12)
"Last Present" (3:24)

Australian version (2004)
The track listing on the 2004 Australian version is:
"Nocturne"
"Prayer"
"Moving"
"Dreamcatcher"
"Sigma"
"Song from a Secret Garden"
"Sona"
"Passacaglia"
"Elan"
"In Our Tears"
"Windancer"
"The Rap"
"You Raise Me Up"
"Heartstrings"
"Greenwaves"
"Papillon"
"Escape"
"Divertimento"
"Illumination"
"I Know a Rose Tree"

Charts

References

External links
Dreamcatcher Allmusic page
Play4Me Music page on Australian version of Dreamcatcher

Secret Garden (duo) albums
2000 compilation albums